Enrique Tomás González Sepúlveda (born November 22, 1985 in Santiago, Chile) is a Chilean artistic gymnast, the first of his country to medal at World Cup events, and the first to qualify for a Summer Olympic Games. He specializes in vault and floor exercises.

Career
González has won nine medals (four golds, four silvers, and one bronze) at World Cup events, six medals (one gold, three silvers, and two bronzes) at Pan American Games, seven medals (two golds, two silvers, and three bronzes) at South American Games and one gold medal at the January 2012 London Olympics test event (where he qualified for the Olympics). He has participated in eight World Championships (2003, 2005, 2007, 2009, 2010, 2011, 2015, and 2017), finishing 7th in 2009, 6th in 2011, 8th in 2015, and 5th in 2017 on floor, and 15th in 2010 and 22nd in 2011 in individual all-around.

In April 2011, González was ranked World No. 1 in floor and vault for the first time.

At the 2012 Summer Olympics in London, González finished fourth in the floor and vault finals, with a score of 15.366 (out of 16.500) and 16.183 (out of 16.800), respectively. His execution score of 9.383 in Vault was the highest among the eight finalists.

He competed at the 2020 Summer Olympics.

Notes

References

External links
 
 
 
 
 

Chilean male artistic gymnasts
Sportspeople from Santiago
Living people
1985 births
Gymnasts at the 2011 Pan American Games
Gymnasts at the 2019 Pan American Games
Gymnasts at the 2012 Summer Olympics
Gymnasts at the 2016 Summer Olympics
Olympic gymnasts of Chile
Pan American Games gold medalists for Chile
Pan American Games silver medalists for Chile
Pan American Games medalists in gymnastics
South American Games gold medalists for Chile
South American Games silver medalists for Chile
South American Games bronze medalists for Chile
South American Games medalists in gymnastics
Competitors at the 2002 South American Games
Competitors at the 2006 South American Games
Competitors at the 2010 South American Games
Competitors at the 2014 South American Games
Competitors at the 2018 South American Games
Medalists at the 2011 Pan American Games
Medalists at the 2019 Pan American Games
Gymnasts at the 2020 Summer Olympics